The 40th Yukon general election will be held on or before November 3, 2025 to elect members to the 36th Yukon Legislative Assembly. Under amendments to the territorial Elections Act passed in 2020, the first fixed election date following the 2021 Yukon general election is set as November 3, 2025. All subsequent elections will take place on the first Monday in November of the fourth calendar year following the previous election. The legislative assembly may be dissolved earlier by order of the Commissioner of Yukon due to a motion of no confidence in the current minority government or on the advice of the premier.

On September 9, 2022, Silver announced his intention to resign as premier and party leader, staying on until the party elects a successor. He was succeeded by Ranj Pillai in 2023.

Opinion polls

References 

Election, 40
Yukon, 40
2022
Yukon, 40